Messenger is Joe Pug's first full-length album.

In contrast to Pug's first EP, Nation of Heat, a full backing band supplements Pug's guitar, vocals and harmonica, a change featured most notably on an electric version of Nation of Heat'''s "Speak Plainly, Diana." Reviewers, like Steve Kolowich at the Washington City Paper, noted that, with Messenger, in contrast to Nation of Heat'', Pug turns from declarative and extroverted to reflective and introspective:

The album met critical acclaim, with Paste Magazine rating it 9.1/10, adding: “unless your surname is Dylan, Waits, Ritter or Prine, you could face-palm yourself to death trying to pen songs half as inspired as the 10 tracks on Joe Pug’s debut full-length.”

Track listing

 "Messenger" – 4:23
 "How Good You Are" – 4:19
 "Not So Sure" – 4:35
 "The Sharpest Crown" – 3:58
 "The Door Was Always Open" – 2:49
 "The First Time I Saw You" – 3:34
 "Unsophisticated Heart" – 3:06
 "Disguised as Someone Else" – 3:34
 "Bury Me Far (From My Uniform)" – 4:07
 "Speak Plainly, Diana" – 3:17

Personnel
Joe Pug - Guitar, Vocals
Tim Bennett - Drums, Percussion
Curtis Evans - Vocal Harmony
Julia Klee - Vocal Harmony
Rocco Labriola	 - Banjo, Pedal Steel Guitar
Jeremy Miller - Vocal Harmony
Matt Scheussler - Guitar (Bass)
Darren Spitzer - Vocal Harmony
Ian Tsan - Drums, Vocal Harmony

References

2010 albums
Joe Pug albums
Lightning Rod Records albums